Pat Bautz may refer to:
Laura P. Bautz (1940–2014), also known as Pat Bautz, American astronomer
Pat Bautz, American rock musician, drummer for Three Dog Night